John Michael Holzinger (1853 – 1929) was a German-born American bryologist, expert on the bryoflora of Colorado, and third president of the Sullivant Moss Society.

Biography

Holzinger was born on May 14, 1853 in Hachtel, Germany. In 1874, he graduated from Olivet College. Holzinger went on to teach science and botany at Winona State Normal School from 1882 to 1890. In 1890, he left to join the United States Department of Agriculture division of botany. In 1893, he returned to Winona where he remained until 1922. 

Holzinger made several noteworthy collections of bryophytes from North America. His Musci Acrocarpi Boreali-Americani exsiccatae was a valuable asset to 20th century bryology.

Legacy
Triodanis holzingeri was named in Holzinger's honor by Rogers McVaugh.

Selected publications
 (1892) List of plants collected by C.S. Sheldon and M.A. Carleton in Indian Territory in 1891. U.S. Dept. of Agriculture. Division of Botany. Contributions from the U.S. National Herbarium
 (1893) List of plants new to Florida. Washington: Govt. Print. Office
 (1893) Descriptions of four new plants from Texas and Colorado. Washington: Govt. Print. Office
 (1895) Report on a collection of plants made by J.H. Sandberg and assistants in northern Idaho in the year 1892. Washington: Gov't Print. Office
 (1898) On some Mosses at High Altitudes
 (1923) The genus Crossidium in North America

References

American botanists
1853 births
1929 deaths